Isbjørnhamna is a bay in Wedel Jarlsberg Land at Spitsbergen, Svalbard. It is located between Wilczekodden and Hansbreen, at the northern side of Hornsund. The bay is named after the Norwegian sealing vessel . A Polish Polar Station is located in Isbjørnhamna.

References

Bays of Spitsbergen